Verrucoentomon is a genus of proturans in the family Acerentomidae.

Species
 Verrucoentomon aurifer Szeptycki, 1988
 Verrucoentomon canadensis (Tuxen, 1955)
 Verrucoentomon imadatei Nosek, 1977
 Verrucoentomon joannis Szeptycki, 1988
 Verrucoentomon kawakatsui (Imadaté, 1964)
 Verrucoentomon mixtum Nosek, 1981
 Verrucoentomon rafalskii Szeptycki, 1997
 Verrucoentomon shirampa (Imadaté, 1964)
 Verrucoentomon xinjiangense Yin, 1987
 Verrucoentomon yushuense Yin, 1980

References

Protura